Dumnagual III (died c. 760) was a king of Strathclyde in the mid-eighth century (probably 754–760). According to the Harleian genealogies, he was the son of Teudebur, one of his predecessors.

According to Symeon of Durham, his kingdom was invaded by both King Óengus I of the Picts and King Eadberht of Northumbria. The same source indicates that on August 1, 756, they arrived at Alt Clut (Dumbarton Rock, Dumnagual's capital) and obtained the homage of the Britons. However, nine days later, the Northumbrian king's army was destroyed while Eadberht was leading it between "Ouania" and "Niwanbirig", probably meaning "Govan" and "Anglian Northumbria". Dumnagual is usually regarded as the king of Alt Clut in the period, but it has also been suggested that the destroyer of the Northumbrian army was Óengus. Phillimore's reconstruction of the Annales Cambriae puts Dumnagual's death in battle at 760. It is thought likely that the territory of Alt Clut remained under Pictish or joint Pictish and English control in the years following his death. Dumnagual is the last British king of Alt Clut to be known as anything more than a name until the later ninth century.

References

 Anderson, Alan Orr, Scottish Annals from English Chroniclers: AD 500–1286, (London, 1908), republished, Marjorie Anderson (ed.) (Stamford, 1991)
 Clancy, Thomas Owen, "Govan, the Name, Again", in Report of the Society of Friends of Govan Old, 8 (1998), pp. 8–13
 Forsyth, Kathryn, "Evidence of a Lost Pictish source in the Historia Regum Anglorum of Symeon of Durham", in Simon Taylor (ed.) Kings, Clerics, and Chronicles in Scotland, 500-1297: Essays in Honour of Marjorie Ogilvie Anderson on the Occasion of Her Ninetieth Birthday, (Dublin, 2000), pp. 19–32; Appendix by John Koch, pp. 33–4.
 MacQuarrie, Alan, "The Kings of Strathclyde", in A. Grant & K.Stringer (eds.) Medieval Scotland: Crown, Lordship and Community, Essays Presented to G.W.S. Barrow, (Edinburgh, 1993), pp. 1–19
 Woolf, Alex, "Onuist son of Uurguist:Tyrannus Carnifex or a David for the Picts", in David Hill & Margaret Worthington (eds.), Æthelbald and Off, Two Eighth-Century Kings of Mercia: Papers from a Conference held in Manchester in 2000, (Manchester, 2005), pp. 35–42.

External links
 Annales Cambriae
 Harleian genealogy 5

760 deaths
Monarchs of Strathclyde
8th-century Scottish monarchs
Year of birth unknown
Year of death uncertain